Petrovouni (meaning "rocky mountain", before 1927: Βασταβέτσι - Vastavetsi) is a village in the municipal unit of Tzoumerka (Ioannina, Epirus), Greece. It is situated on a mountainside of the Athamanika mountains, above the left bank of the river Arachthos, at 1,030 m elevation. It is 3 km north of Chouliarades, 9 km west of Syrrako and 17 km southeast of Ioannina. Its population is 79 people (2011 census).

Population

See also

List of settlements in the Ioannina regional unit

External links
Petrovouni at the GTP Travel Pages

References

Populated places in Ioannina (regional unit)